John Smith (15 September 1886 – 4 September 1916) was an English footballer and one of the most prolific goal-scorers in the history of Hull City, notching 102 goals from only 168 outings for the club. His 32 goals in 1909–10 made him the top goal-scorer in Europe that season.

Family
John was married in Sculcoates, Kingston upon Hull to Annie Bosworth in 1907.

Career
John "Jacky" Smith was born September 1883 in the Tyneside pit village of Wardley. After establishing himself as a rare goal-scoring talent at Hebburn Argyle, Smith was signed by Second Division Hull City whilst still a teenager in June 1905 and, following a prolific spell in the reserves, quickly established himself in the first team under player manager Ambrose Langley.

Equally accomplished as an inside right or a centre-forward, Smith consolidated his position as a fans favourite during the 1906–07 season with 19 goals in 34 League appearances before setting a new club record of 31 goals from 37 games in 1907–08. Such was Smith's form around this time, that he belied his Second Division status by becoming Hull City's first representative player when called up to play for the Football League against the Scottish League.

Despite being the subject of attention from bigger First Division Clubs, Smith stayed loyal to the Hull City cause and, though a series of injuries restricted him to just 10 goals in 23 appearances during 1908–09, he bounced back to spearhead his club's promotion challenge in 1909–10, notching no fewer than four hat-tricks in a haul of 32 goals from only 35 outings, making him the top scorer in Europe that season. Despite Smith's efforts, Hull City agonisingly missed out on promotion to the First Division on goal difference to Oldham Athletic.

Smith desperately wanted to prove himself in the First Division and, though he began the 1910–11 season as a Hull City player, he was soon enticed to Sheffield United for a transfer fee of £500 where he was to score seven times in only 12 league games for the Blades, before Nottingham Forest signed him to spearhead an ultimately futile bid to avoid relegation.

Back in the Second Division with Forest, Smith quickly became disillusioned with the professional game and went on to spend time at non-league Nelson FC and York City before seeing out his career as a full-back for Heckmondwike in the Yorkshire League.

Playing style
Jacky Smith was only 5 ft 7in tall, but what he lacked in height he more than made up for in heart. According to a report in the Hull Daily Mail he was described as: "Although only a small man, he is endowed with any amount of trickery, yet prefers to bustle his opponents and seems to take glory in charging a six-foot back."

Death
Following the outbreak of World War I, Smith was enlisted in the York & Lancaster Regiment and was aged 29 when he was killed in action during the early days of September 1916 in the Battle of the Somme, leaving a widow and six children. Two of his sons, Jack Smith and Jim Smith, went on to play professional Rugby league for the Hull Kingston Rovers.

References

External links
 Before Gboot
 Hull City All-Time Top Scorers

 
English footballers
Hebburn Argyle F.C. players
Hull City A.F.C. players
1880s births
1916 deaths
English Football League players
English Football League representative players
British military personnel killed in the Battle of the Somme
Association football forwards
West Stanley F.C. players
Sheffield United F.C. players
Nottingham Forest F.C. players
Nelson F.C. players
York City F.C. (1908) players
British Army personnel of World War I
York and Lancaster Regiment soldiers
Military personnel from County Durham